William "Bill" J. Kilpatrick, was a professional rugby league footballer who played in the 1920s and 1930s. He played at representative level for Other Nationalities, and at club level for Oldham (Heritage № 257).

International honours
Bill Kilpatrick won a cap for Other Nationalities while at Oldham in 1930.

References

External links
Statistics at orl-heritagetrust.org.uk
Representative Honours

English rugby league players
Oldham R.L.F.C. players
Other Nationalities rugby league team players
Place of birth missing
Place of death missing
Year of birth missing
Year of death missing